The 12021/22 Howrah–Barbil Jan Shatabdi Express is a superfast express train of the Jan Shatabdi Express series belonging to Indian Railways – South Eastern Railway zone that runs between  and  in India. The Departure of Shatabdi from Howrah Junction was at 06.45 AM, and it reached Tatanagar Junction at 10.30 AM. Reverse, the Shatabdi used to depart Tatanagar Junction at 5.00 PM, reaching Howrah Junction at 8.45 PM. The Shatabdi was replaced by this train due to low patronage with extension up till Barbil in Odisha. Now it operates as train number 12021 from Howrah Junction to Barbil and as train number 12022 in the reverse direction serving the states of West Bengal, Jharkhand and Odisha due to the fact that Barbil cuts across the state line between Jharkhand and Odisha.

It is part of the Jan Shatabdi Express series launched by the former railway minister of India, Mr. Nitish Kumar in the 2002 / 03 Rail Budget  .

Coaches

The 12021 / 22 Howrah–Barbil Jan Shatabdi Express has a LHB Rake with 4 AC Chair Car, 12 Non AC Chair Car, 1 Seating cum Luggage coach & 1 Power Car (EOG) Coach. It does not carry a pantry car.

As is customary with most train services in India, coach composition may be amended at the discretion of Indian Railways depending on demand.

Service

The maximum permissible speed of this train is 130 km/h between Rajkharsawan and Andul.

As the average speed of the train is above , as per Indian Railways rules, its fare includes a Superfast surcharge.

Routing

The 12021 / 22 Howrah–Barbil Jan Shatabdi Express runs from Howrah Junction via , Jhargram and Ghatsila railway station, Chaibasa, Dangoaposi to Barbil .

Traction

As the entire route is fully electrified, a -based / WAP-7 or Tatanagar-based WAP-7 locomotives powers the train for its entire journey.

Operation

12021 Howrah–Barbil Jan Shatabdi Express runs from Howrah Junction on a daily basis arriving Barbil the same day .
12022 Barbil–Howrah Jan Shatabdi Express runs from Barbil on a daily basis arriving Howrah Junction the same day .

Incidents

On 1 August 2009, a gang of armed men had looted the passengers of the AC Chair Car coaches

References 

 http://timesofindia.indiatimes.com/city/kolkata/Robbery-in-Barbil-Howrah-Janshatabdi-Express/articleshow/4846468.cms
 https://www.flickr.com/photos/50628848@N07/6620093429/
 http://www.flickriver.com/photos/46085415@N05/6594816697/
 http://erail.in/12021-bbn-janshatabdi
 http://erail.in/12022-bbn-janshatabdi
 http://pib.nic.in/archive/railbudget/railbgt2002-03/railbgtsp1.html
 https://web.archive.org/web/20160126012037/http://www.indianrail.gov.in/jan_shatabdi.html

External links

|

Rail transport in West Bengal
Rail transport in Jharkhand
Rail transport in Odisha
Jan Shatabdi Express trains
Trains from Howrah Junction railway station
Rail transport in Howrah